Flatcat is a Belgian DIY punk rock band. Founded by the Luyckx brothers in 1993 they have played numerous countries since then, including two Brazilian headlining tours.

Lineup
 Dieter 'minx' Meyns: guitar, vocals
 Wim Luyckx: drums
 Dirk Luyckx: guitar
 Alexander Jonckheere: bass, backing vocals

Accomplishments
 Did two Brazilian tours in 2001 and 2002
 Videoclip "Beautiful in Venice" aired on MTV Brazil in 2002
 Flatcat is the first band ever to sell out the Magdalenazaal (1200 p.) in Bruges, their hometown
 "Hear Tonight" Number 9 spot in "De Afrekening", Belgium's most respected alternative radio hitlist in 2004. Also included on the "De Afrekening vol. 33" chart compilation (Universal)
 Videoclip "Wait and see" gets A-rotation on TMF (MTV Belgium) in 2004
 Flatcat was on the lineup of French Alternative Festival "BetiZFest"
 Flatcat sells a performance together with Nailpin for Tsunami 1212 on JIM TV and TMF in 2005
 "Rockstar Fantasy (Break It)" in De Afrekening for no less than 13 weeks in 2005. Also included on the "De Afrekening vol. 38" chart compilation (Universal).

Discography

Demos
Demo Tape (1996, sold out)
Punkrock RIP Promo Tape (1999)

Albums

Four Lessons To Drive (2001, split release with Belvedere, Reset and Predial, released on Highlight Sounds, Brazil only).
Better Luck Next Time (2002, released on Eye Spy Records in Europe and Highlight Sounds in South America).
Flatcat/Five Days Off (2004, split release with Five Days Off, released on Eye Spy Records and Funtime Records).
So This Is When We Grow Up (2006, released on Eye Spy Records).

Singles

Better Luck Next Time (2002)
Hear Tonight (2004)
Wait And See (2004)
Rockstar Fantasy (Break It) (2005)
So This is When We Grow Up (2006)
My Heart is Bulletproof (2007)
The Great Escape (2011)
All Anchors are Lost (ft. Sean Dhondt) (2011)

7’’
Beautiful in Venice (2002)

Contributions
1996 Best of Belgium I (Green Leaf Records)
1999 Elements (Funtime Records)
1999 Best of Belgium II (Green Leaf Records)
2000 "Mr. Popular Guy" on Summer's Gone (Janez Detd single)
2001 Club Zed (Headcore Records - France)
2001 Funtime Records Sampler + Magazine
2001 100% Skate (Century Media - Brasil)
2001 Caddy of the Year (Below Par Records)
2002 Skateboard movie Soundtrack (Tribo Magazine Brasil - with Bob Burnquist)
2003 LDG Records
2004 De Afrekening 33
2004 Essentieel Belgisch (TMF Vlaanderen)
2005 DMAC compilation (DMAC)
2005 De Afrekening 38
2005 Airboard Movie Soundtrack  (Switzerland)

External links
 Official website

Belgian punk rock groups